William Outis Allison (1849 – December 18, 1924) was the first Mayor of Englewood Cliffs, New Jersey after it split from Englewood, New Jersey in 1895 and served four terms in office.

Biography
Allison was born in 1849 in Undercliff (now Edgewater, New Jersey).

His home burned to the ground in November 1903, resulting in a loss estimated at $75,000.

He died on December 18, 1924, at his apartment at 115 West 16th Street in Manhattan. He was buried in Brookside Cemetery in Englewood, New Jersey. His estate was worth over $3,000,000.

References

External links

1849 births
1924 deaths
Mayors of places in New Jersey
People from Edgewater, New Jersey
People from Englewood, New Jersey
People from Englewood Cliffs, New Jersey